HMS Norwich was a 50-gun fourth rate ship of the line of the Royal Navy, built according to the 1741 proposals of the 1719 Establishment at Blackwall Yard, and launched on 4 July 1745.

Norwich served until 1768, when she was sold out of the navy.

Notes

References

Lavery, Brian (2003) The Ship of the Line - Volume 1: The development of the battlefleet 1650-1850. Conway Maritime Press. .
PLAN OF CHALEUR BAY IN THE GULF OF St. LAURENCE Surveyed by His Majesty's Ship NORWICH in 1760 - indicates where HMS Norwich was almost lost, 1760

Ships of the line of the Royal Navy
1745 ships
Ships built by the Blackwall Yard